Mountain Stream may refer to:

 Mountain stream, a fast-flowing stream in the mountains
 Mountain Stream Salamander
 Mountain Stream Tree Frog
 Mountain Stream, an oil on canvas painting by Marilyn Bendell